Adam Ling (born 9 September 1991) is a New Zealand rower. He won a gold medal at the 2015 World Rowing Championships in the lightweight single sculls, but missed the Olympic qualification for the lightweight double sculls the following year.

Early life
Ling was born in 1991. He received his secondary schooling at Aquinas College in Tauranga apart from his last year, which he spent at Tauranga Boys' College. He started rowing in 2005 while at Aquinas College.

Rowing career
Ling had his first international experience at the 2012 World Rowing U23 Championships in Trakai, Lithuania, where he came eighth with the lightweight men's four. At the 2013 World Rowing U23 Championships in Linz, Austria, he came fourth in the lightweight men's single sculls. Ling became an elite rower in 2014, and at the 2014 World Rowing Championships in Amsterdam in the Netherlands, he competed in the lightweight men's double sculls with Alistair Bond. They came second in their semi-final race, but did not start in the final. In early 2015, Ling became national champion in the lightweight men's single sculls at Lake Ruataniwha, beating Peter Taylor. At the 2015 World Rowing Championships in Aiguebelette, France, with "almost textbook-perfect race strategy" he won the A final ahead of Rajko Hrvat of Slovenia and Miloš Stanojević of Serbia.

At the 2016 Final Olympic Qualification Regatta in Lucerne, Switzerland, Ling was partnered with Toby Cunliffe-Steel in the lightweight men's double sculls. They would have had to be within the first three spots to qualify for the 2016 Summer Olympics, but came sixth and thus missed out. At the 2017 New Zealand rowing nationals at Lake Ruataniwha, he came second to Matthew Dunham in the premier lightweight singles.

References

External links 
 

1991 births
Living people
New Zealand male rowers
World Rowing Championships medalists for New Zealand
People educated at Tauranga Boys' College
People educated at Aquinas College, Tauranga